Below is a list of notable footballers who have played for Sepahan.

List of players
 Ahmad Reza Abedzadeh
Abdul-Wahab Abu Al-Hail
Abbas Aghaei
Hamid Azizadeh
Farshad Bahadorani
Saeid Bayat
Kabir Bello
Mohsen Bengar
Edmond Bezik
Ehsan Hajysafi
Mohsen Hamidi
Masoud Homami
Abolhassan Jafari
Hadi Jafari
 Mahmoud Karimi
Hossein Kazemi
Rasoul Khatibi
Ebrahim Loveinian
Mehrdad Minavand
Abbas Mohammadi
Jalaladin Ali Mohammadi
Emad Mohammed
Ahmad Momenzadeh
Jaba Mujiri
Moharram Navidkia
Mohammad Noori
Hossein Papi
 Armenak Petrosyan
Amir Radi
Mehdi Rahmati
Mohammad Savari
Seyed Mohammad Salehi
Hamid Shafiei
 Ali Shojaei
Levon Stepanyan
Kamil Susko
Reza Talabeh
Hojatolah Zadmahmoud

Sepahan S.C.